Reginald Robert Laird (August 6, 1913 – November 29, 1970) was a Canadian politician. He served in the Legislative Assembly of British Columbia from 1945 to 1949  from the electoral district of Similkameen, a member of the Coalition government.

References

1913 births
1970 deaths